Jemmy usually refers to a Crowbar (tool) or jimmy, a metal bar with a curved end

It is also a diminutive of Jimmy and often refers to people, including:
 Jemmy Botting or James Botting (1783–1837) hangman at Newgate Prison in London, England, from 1817 to 1819 
 Jemmy Button (c. 1815 – 1864), a native Fuegian
 Jemmy Dean  (1816–1881) an English professional cricketer
 Jemmy Hirst (1738–1829) an English eccentric.
 Jemmy Moore (1839–1890) an Australian cricketer 
 Jemmy Shaw a pioneer of early dog shows, a promoter of dog fighting and rat-baiting
 Jemmy (slave leader) – leader of the Stono Rebellion a slave rebellion in 1739
 Jemmy Wood (1756–1836)  "The Gloucester Miser"

It may also refer to:
 Jemmy Jones Island an island in British Columbia
 Jemmy Joneson’s Whurry a traditional Geordie folk song c1815
 Jemmy Twitcher a character in John Gay's The Beggar's Opera supposedly based on John Wilkes